The year 1777 in architecture involved some significant architectural events and new buildings.

Events
 April 21 – The foundation stone of Wesley's Chapel in London is laid.

Buildings and structures

Buildings completed

 Corselitze, Falster, Denmark, designed by Andreas Kirkerup.
 Drumcar House, Ireland.
 Reformed Church, Lompirt, Romania.
 Rococo-Classicist Roman Catholic Church in Malý Kiar, The Glorification of the Saint Cross.
 Wenvoe Castle, Vale of Glamorgan, the only building in Wales designed by Robert Adam.
 Home House, Portman Square, London, completed to the design of Robert Adam.
 Richmond Bridge, London (across the River Thames), designed by James Paine and Kenton Couse.

Births
 February 13 – James Trubshaw, English builder, architect and civil engineer. (died 1853)
 September 9 — John Holden Greene, American architect based in Providence, Rhode Island (died 1850)
 October 11 – Fop Smit, Dutch architect, shipbuilder, and shipowner (died 1866)

Deaths
 March 3 – Sir Thomas Robinson, 1st Baronet, English nobleman and amateur architect (born c.1703)
 December 23 – Thomas Farnolls Pritchard, British architect and interior designer (born 1723)

References

Architecture
Years in architecture
18th-century architecture